The XIV Corps of the Ottoman Empire (Turkish: 14 ncü Kolordu or On Dördüncü Kolordu) was one of the corps of the Ottoman Army. It was formed in the early 20th century during Ottoman military reforms.

Formation

Order of battle, 1911 
With further reorganizations of the Ottoman Army, to include the creation of corps level headquarters, by 1911 the XIV Corps was headquartered in Sana'a. The Corps before the First Balkan War in 1911 was structured as such:

XIV Corps, Sana'a
39th Infantry Division, Sana'a
115th Infantry Regiment, Sana'a
116th Infantry Regiment, Zimar
117th Infantry Regiment, Umran, Zindiye, Shibam
39th Rifle Battalion, Su'il Hamis
40th Infantry Division, Hudeyde
118th Infantry Regiment, Hudeyde
119th Infantry Regiment, Taiz
120th Infantry Regiment, Hicce
40th Rifle Battalion, Sana'a
41st Infantry Division, Ebha
109th Infantry Regiment, Ebha
110th Infantry Regiment, Ebha
111th Infantry Regiment, Ebha
28th Mountain Artillery Battalion, Ebha
Units of XIV Corps
37th Cavalry Regiment, Sana'a
27th Mountain Artillery Battalion, vicinity of Sana'a
14th Engineer Battalion, Sana'a
Regular Battalion, Tehame
Engineer Company, Sinan Paşa

World War I

Order of battle, December 1916 
In December 1916, the corps was structured as follows:

XIV Corps (Gallipoli)
57th Division, 59th Division

Order of battle, August 1917, January 1918, June 1918, September 1918 
In August 1917, January 1918, June 1918, September 1918, the corps was structured as follows:

XIV Corps (Gallipoli)
57th Division

After Mudros

Order of battle, November 1918 
In November 1918, the corps was structured as follows:

XIV Corps (Gallipoli)
49th Division, 60th Division, 61st Division

Order of battle, January 1919 
In January 1919, the corps was structured as follows:

XIV Corps (Thrace, Tekfurdağı; present day: Tekirdağ)
55th Division (Tekfurdağı)
168th Infantry Regiment, 170th Infantry Regiment, 171st Infantry Regiment
61st Division (Bandırma)
180th Infantry Regiment, 188th Infantry Regiment, 190th Infantry Regiment

Sources

Corps of the Ottoman Empire
Military units and formations of the Ottoman Empire in World War I
Ottoman period in Yemen